Detlef Michel (born October 13, 1955 in Berlin), is a German track and field athlete.  He represented East Germany during the 1980s and was one of the world's best in the javelin throw.  His most important result came when he won the World Championship title in Helsinki 1983 with a throw of 89.48 meters in adverse conditions (rain), beating world record holder Tom Petranoff (99.72m, 5 May 1983) of the USA by a comfortable margin. In fact, Michel threw the four longest throws of the final.

He competed in the Olympic Games twice, in 1980 and 1988, but went out in the qualifying round both times. He was unable to compete in 1984 due to his country's boycott of the games in Los Angeles and retired from professional sports in 1990.

Michel represented the Berlin sport club and trained with Peter Börner. During his career he was 1.84 meters tall and weighed 93 kilograms.

Michel's personal best under the old (pre-1986) javelin design specifications of 96.72 meters, thrown in Berlin on June 8, 1983, was for a while tied with Ferenc Paragi for second best in the world, behind only Petranoff's world record; it was later also exceeded by Uwe Hohn.

Results at the European Athletics Championships
1978: 4th place (85.46)
1982: 3rd place (89.32)
1986: 2nd place (81.90)

References

External links 
 

1955 births
Living people
Athletes from Berlin
East German male javelin throwers
World Athletics Championships athletes for East Germany
World Athletics Championships medalists
European Athletics Championships medalists
Athletes (track and field) at the 1980 Summer Olympics
Athletes (track and field) at the 1988 Summer Olympics
Olympic athletes of East Germany
World Athletics Championships winners
Friendship Games medalists in athletics